Smojmirovo is a village in the Berovo Municipality of North Macedonia.

Smojmirovo's original name (with diacritics) is Smojmirovo. Smijmirovo's distance is 3.6 km/2.24 mi away from the center of the municipality.

Demographics
According to the 2002 census, the village had a total of 765 inhabitants. Ethnic groups in the village include:

Macedonians 764
Serbs 1

References

External links
 Visit Macedonia

Villages in Berovo Municipality